Vesuvius is a Canadian metal band from Ottawa, Ontario. Formed in 2012, it currently consists of Ben Cooligan (clean vocals), Billy Melsness (unclean vocals), Robin Parsons (keyboards / turntables), Michael Luc Malo (guitars) and Carter Peak (drums).

On February 26, 2016, it was announced through Alternative Press that Vesuvius had signed with Tragic Hero Records and released their debut single, "Nurture". They released their debut album, My Place Of Solace And Rest, on May 6, 2016.

Discography

Studio albums 
 My Place of Solace and Rest (2016)

Singles 
 This House Is Not A Home (2015)
 Nurture (2016)

Band members

Current 
 Billy Melsness - Unclean vocals (2012–present)
 Robin Parsons - Keyboards, Turntables (2012–present)
 Carter Peak - Drums (2014–present)

Former 
 Ben Cooligan - Clean vocals (2012–2016)
 Michael Luc Malo - Lead and Rhythm guitar (2015–2016)

References

Canadian heavy metal musical groups
Musical groups from Ottawa
Tragic Hero Records artists
Musical groups established in 2012
2012 establishments in Ontario